Saturne Party was held in Chelles/Paris. (France) by Saturne. 300-1000 people party.

Amiga, PC, Music and Graphics competitions. Modules preselected for the music competition, Intros limited at 64k.

The final, 1997 edition of the party became notorious on the scene due to an early electric failure in the main hall which left the venue without power for most of the event.

Competition winners

References

External links 
 http://www.saturne.org

Demo parties